Isaac Noah Mannheimer (October 17, 1793, Copenhagen – March 17, 1865, Vienna) was a Jewish preacher.

Biography
The son of a chazzan, he began the study of the Talmud at an early age, though not to the neglect of secular studies. On completing the course of the cathedral school at Copenhagen, he took up philosophy, Oriental languages, and theology at the university there, at the same time continuing his studies in Talmud and Jewish science. When the Jews of Denmark were emancipated in 1814, confirmation was made obligatory, and the office of catechist was instituted by the state, Mannheimer being the first incumbent (1816). The first confirmation took place May 1817. In 1821 Mannheimer went to Vienna, where there was then no congregation, the community being divided into two opposing parties. Mannheimer, who was welcomed by both factions, soon succeeded in organizing a congregation, drafting a program and ritual on the traditional basis and harmonizing the views of the two parties. He returned to Copenhagen in December of the same year. Failing in his attempt to secure a new synagogue for Reform services, he accepted a call to the pulpit left vacant by Zunz in Berlin. German services, however, were interdicted in that city; the temple formerly under the ministry of B. Beer was closed, and the royal cabinet order of 26 December 1823, obtained by the Orthodox party, frustrated the attempt to adapt the old ritual to new forms by delivering German sermons in the chief synagogue. Mannheimer therefore left Berlin and took temporary charge of the pulpit of Hamburg, preaching also at Leipzig during the fairs. In 1824 he married Liseke Damier, and in November of the same year he was called to the new synagogue of Vienna. As he could not receive the title of preacher or rabbi, he was inducted, in June, 1825, as "Direktor der Wiener K. K. Genehmigten Oeffentlichen Israelitischen Religionsschule"; he dedicated the new temple in April, 1826, and officiated there until 1829.

Mannheimer's success was due in great measure to his oratorical gifts. His sermons were, for their time, models (Geiger, Einleitung in das Studium der Jüdischen Theologie, in Nachgelassene Schriften, ii. 31). His German translation of the prayerbook and of the fast-day prayers, and his arrangement of the fast-day liturgy, are of permanent importance for the ritual, the conservative spirit in which this work was undertaken leading to its adoption by many communities.

In 1848 Mannheimer was returned by Brody to the Austrian Reichstag, where he delivered two memorable speeches, one on the Jewish tax (5 October 1848) and the other on the abolition of capital punishment (29 January 1849). On his seventieth birthday the city of Vienna conferred honorary citizenship upon him. He devoted the gifts bestowed by the community upon him on that occasion to a foundation for the aid of rabbis, preachers, and teachers, which still bears his name.

In 1863, Mannheimer, along with Lazar Horowitz, defended Heinrich Graetz, in Viennese court when Graetz was accused of heresy for an article published by Leopold Kompert in a local journal.  Graetz had written that the chapters in Isaiah referring to the Messiah were meant to be interpreted non-literally, and that they referred to a national Messiah instead of a personal one.  Isaac Hirsch Weiss published a pamphlet entitled Neẓaḥ Yisrael in support of the testimony. See Heinrich Graetz #The Kompert Affair.

Works
Mannheimer published the following works: Prædikener Holdte ved det Mosaiske Troes-Samfund's Andagts-Övelser i Modersmaalet i Sommerhalvaaret 1819 (Copenhagen, 1819); Gottesdienstliche Vorträge Gehalten im Israelitischen Bethause zu Wien im Monate Tischri 5594 (Vienna, 1834); Gottesdienstliche Vorträge für die Wochenabschnitte des Jahres, vol. i, Genesis and Exodus (ib. 1835; partly translated into Hebrew by E Kuttner, ib. 1865); a translation of the prayer-book and of the fast-day prayers according to the ritual of the Vienna Temple (1840; frequently reprinted). His polemics and responsa include: Gutachten für das Gebetbuch des Hamburger Tempels (1841); Gutachten Gegen die Reformpartei in Frankfurt-am-Main in Angelegenheit der Beschneidungsfrage (1843); Einige Worte über Juden und Judenthum (supplement to the Oesterreichische Medicinische Wochenschrift, 1842, No. 34), directed against Professor Rosa's statements in reference to the Jewish Question (1848). Two numbers of his Gottesdienstliche Vorträge appeared posthumously, edited by S. Hammerschlag (Vienna, 1876).

References 
 
 Literature by and about Issac Noah Mannheimer in University Library JCS Frankfurt am Main: Digital Collections Judaica

Bibliography 
 G. Wolf, Isak Noa Mannheimer, Prediger: Eine Biographische Skizze, Vienna, 1863 (Italian transl. by Lelio della Torre, Triest, 1863)
 Meyer Kayserling, Bibliothek Jüdischer Kanzelredner, i. 285, and the bibliography there given
 M. Rosenmann, Isak Noa Mannheimer. Aus seinem Leben und Wirken, Vienna, 1915
 Idem, Isak Noa Mannheimer. Sein Leben und Wirken, Vienna, 1922

External links 

 Digitized works by Isaac Noah Mannheimer at the Leo Baeck Institute, New York

See also 
 IKG Wien

1793 births
1865 deaths
People from Copenhagen
Danish rabbis
Austrian rabbis
Austrian people of Danish descent
Members of the Imperial Diet (Austria)
Burials at the Vienna Central Cemetery